Jože Ilija (12 March 1928 – 19 May 1983) was a Slovenian  slalom canoeist who competed for Yugoslavia in the 1950s. He won a bronze medal in the folding K-1 event at the 1955 ICF Canoe Slalom World Championships in Tacen.

He was also an alpine skier. He competed in three events at the 1956 Winter Olympics, representing Yugoslavia.

References

External links
 
  
 
 
 

1928 births
1983 deaths
Yugoslav male canoeists
Slovenian male canoeists
Medalists at the ICF Canoe Slalom World Championships
Slovenian male alpine skiers
Olympic alpine skiers of Yugoslavia
Alpine skiers at the 1956 Winter Olympics